Prose Studies: History, Theory, Criticism is a peer-reviewed academic journal that covers research on non-fictional prose from all periods. It covers subjects such as literature, literary history, biography and autobiography, and literary genres. It was established in 1977 as Prose Studies 1800-1900 and obtained its current name in 1980.

Abstracting and indexing 
The journal is abstracted and indexed in America: History and Life, British Humanities Index, and the MLA International Bibliography.

External links 
 

English-language journals
Publications established in 1977
Taylor & Francis academic journals
Triannual journals
Literary magazines